Greece competed at the 2017 World Aquatics Championships in Budapest, Hungary from 14 July to 30 July.

Open water swimming

Greece has entered three open water swimmers

Swimming

Greek swimmers have achieved qualifying standards in the following events (up to a maximum of 2 swimmers in each event at the A-standard entry time, and 1 at the B-standard):

Men

Women

Synchronized swimming

Greece's synchronized swimming team consisted of 13 athletes (1 male and 12 female).

Women

Mixed

 Legend: (R) = Reserve Athlete

Water polo

Greece qualified both a men's and women's teams.

Men's tournament

Team roster

Konstantinos Flegkas
Konstantinos Genidounias
Evangelos Delakas
Georgios Dervisis
Ioannis Fountoulis (C)
Marios Kapotsis
Kyriakos Pontikeas
Stylianos Argyropoulos
Konstantinos Mourikis
Christodoulos Kolomvos
Alexandros Gounas
Angelos Vlachopoulos
Emmanouil Zerdevas

Group play

Playoffs

Quarterfinals

Semifinals

Third place game

Women's tournament

Team roster

Eleni Kouvdou
Christina Tsoukala
Vasiliki Diamantopoulou
Nikoleta Eleftheriadou
Margarita Plevritou
Alkisti Avramidou
Alexandra Asimaki (C)
Ioanna Chydirioti
Christina Kotsia
Triantafyllia Manolioudaki
Eleftheria Plevritou
Eleni Xenaki
Chrysoula Diamantopoulou

Group play

Quarterfinals

5th–8th place semifinals

Seventh place game

References

Nations at the 2017 World Aquatics Championships
Greece at the World Aquatics Championships
2017 in Greek sport